The Last Show may refer to: 
"The Last Show" (The Mary Tyler Moore Show), the final episode of The Mary Tyler Moore Show
The Last Show (film), an Irish film directed by Rita-Marie Lawlor (2015)
A Prairie Home Companion (film), a film released using this title in some markets
The Last Show, a CD album of blues guitarist Alvin Lee's last live performance on 28 May 2012 at Raalte, Holland before he died in March 2013